Niia Bertino (born July 11, 1988), better known by her stage name Niia, is an American singer, pianist, and songwriter.

Early life
Niia was born in Needham, Massachusetts, and was trained by her mother in classical piano and began singing and performing at the age of 13. Bertino's mother hails from Italy and is the daughter of an opera singer, while her extended family boasts many vocalists trained at the Juilliard School.  She was invited to attend the Berklee College of Music summer program at age fourteen. After high school, Niia moved to New York City where she briefly attended the New School for Jazz and Contemporary Music as a Jazz vocal major.  She later settled in Los Angeles.

Musical career
While living in New York, Niia met singer, songwriter and producer Wyclef Jean. After working with Wyclef and producer Jerry Wonda, Niia was a featured artist on 2007 single, "Sweetest Girl (Dollar Bill)", which also featured Lil' Wayne and Akon. The song peaked at number twelve on the U.S. Billboard Hot 100 after fifteen weeks on the chart and was RIAA certified Platinum.

Niia has toured around the world and performed on programs such as VH1 Soul Stage, the Late Show with David Letterman, Jimmy Kimmel Live!, The Late Late Show with Craig Ferguson, the BET Awards and MTV New Year's Eve in Times Square.

In 2011, Niia began performing The Best of 007 in New York. Backed by a 14 piece orchestra, Niia paid homage to the soundtrack of James Bond films including classics "Goldfinger", "Thunderball", and "The Spy Who Loved Me". She has also released covers of the classic track Mad World by Tears for Fears, Jai Paul's viral hit BTSTU, and Cher's Bang Bang (My Baby Shot Me Down).

In February 2013, Niia self-released her single "Made For You" and premiered the video, directed by famed American History X director Tony Kaye, on The Fader. In October 2013, Bertino was the presenter of a TED Talk titled Beauty Overcomes Fear at the annual TEDxOrangeCoast event. She has also performed for the likes of Google.

She teamed up with Robin Hannibal on music in preparation for her debut EP Generation Blue, released on October 28, 2014. In 2015, Bertino, alongside Josef Salvat, was featured on Tourist's single "Holding On".

In June 2016, she released a new single "Bored To Death" which was premiered by Zane Lowe on his Beats 1 radio show.

Awards
In 2005, Niia was selected by the National Foundation for the Advancement of the Arts as one of the top 100 singers in the country, and the national winner in the jazz voice category National Foundation for Advancement in the Arts Recognition and Talent Search.

Discography

Albums

Extended plays

Singles

Featured singles

Music videos

As lead artist

As featured artist

References

1988 births
Living people
American women pop singers
Schools of the Sacred Heart alumni
People from Needham, Massachusetts
21st-century American women singers
21st-century American women pianists
21st-century American pianists
21st-century American singers